= Girl Flyers =

Girl Flyers is a children's mystery series written by Bess Moyer, and published by Goldsmith (Chicago) in 1932. The series consists of two books, Gypsies of the Air and Girl Flyers on Adventure Island.

It was about a set of twin sisters who, because they had grown up on an airstrip owned by their father, flew planes and also worked on them. This tended to put them into the thick of mysteries, which they would then solve.
